Discoverer 31, also known as Corona 9024, was an American optical reconnaissance satellite which was launched in 1961. It was a KH-3 Corona''' satellite, based on an Agena-B.

The launch of Discoverer 31 occurred at 21:00 UTC on 17 September 1961. A Thor DM-21 Agena-B rocket was used, flying from Launch Complex 75-1-1 at the Vandenberg Air Force Base. Upon successfully reaching orbit, it was assigned the Harvard designation 1961 Alpha Beta 1.

Images were recorded onto  film, and were to have been returned in a Satellite Recovery Vehicle. The Satellite Recovery Vehicle carried aboard Discoverer 31 was SRV-552. During the spacecraft's thirty-third orbit, the attitude control and power systems malfunctioned, and as a result Discoverer 31 was unable to complete its mission or return images. It decayed from orbit on 26 October 1961.

References

Spacecraft launched in 1961
Spacecraft which reentered in 1961